The participation of Kazakhstan in the ABU TV Song Festival has occurred seven times since the inaugural ABU TV Song Festival began in 2012. Since their début in 2015, the Kazakh entry has been organised by the national broadcaster Kazakhstan Radio and Television Corporation (KRTC). In 2020, Kazakhstan withdrew from the festival, but then came back the following year.

History
Kazmedia Ortalygy is a member of the Asia-Pacific Broadcasting Union, and will participate at the ABU TV Song Festival 2015, on the same day it was announced that Dimash Kudaibergen would represent Kazakhstan. On 13 September 2015 it was revealed that Dimash would perform "Daididau" in Istanbul, Turkey.

Participation overview

See also 
 Kazakhstan in the Intervision Song Contest
 Kazakhstan in the Türkvizyon Song Contest
 Kazakhstan in Junior Eurovision Song Contest

References 

Countries at the ABU Song Festival
Kazakhstani music